Arturo Caprotti (22 March 1881 – 9 February 1938) was an Italian engineer and architect. In 1915 or 1916 he invented the Caprotti valve gear rotary cam poppet valve gear for steam engines of all kinds, but in practice it was employed almost exclusively in railway locomotives.

External links
 Continental engineers at www.steamindex.com

1881 births
1938 deaths
Locomotive builders and designers
20th-century Italian architects
Italian mechanical engineers
20th-century Italian engineers
20th-century Italian inventors